Lindsay Bury (9 July 1857 – 30 October 1935) was an English amateur footballer who, playing as a full back, helped the Old Etonians win the FA Cup in 1879 and made two appearances for England in the 1870s. He also played cricket for Hampshire in 1877 and for Cambridge University in 1877 and 1878.

Education
Bury was born in Withington, Manchester and was educated at Eton College. He played for the college football team in 1875 and 1876, before going up to Trinity College, Cambridge. At Cambridge, he earned a blue for football in both 1877 and 1878, as well as a blue for cricket in 1877. He was also especially noted for his sprinting and hammer throwing, and won athletics blues in 1878, 1879 and 1880. He graduated BA in the latter year.

Football career
Bury appeared regularly for the Old Etonians and for Cambridge University. His first England appearance came as left-back on 3 March 1877, when he was still at University. He was one of seven débutantes in the England team to play Scotland at the Kennington Oval. According to Philip Gibbons, in the 1870s the England side "tended to be chosen on availability rather than skill alone" The change in the England line-up made little difference to England's performance against the Scots who won the game 3–1, with England's consolation goal coming from Alfred Lyttelton; the Scots thus inflicted England's first international defeat on home soil in the sixth appearance between the two countries.

Along with most of the other international débutantes, he was not selected for the next England match, but he was recalled for the first ever match between England and Wales on 18 January 1879. As Wales had been defeated 9–0 in their previous international against Scotland, England were confident of victory and selected an inexperienced eleven, including five débutantes. The match was played at the Kennington Oval in a blizzard. Due to the atrocious snowfall both captains agreed to play halves of only 30 minutes each. The poor attendance (reports range from 85 to 300) was also attributed to the weather. Some sources suggest that William Clegg turned up 20 minutes late for the game. Clegg, a solicitor, was working late on a case (the trial of Charles Peace, the Banner Cross murderer) and was unable to leave Sheffield for London on the Friday night. The next morning, the southbound train with Clegg on it, was delayed by heavy snow. The match started without Clegg and England played with ten men until he arrived. Despite this, England won the match by two goals to one, with Herbert Whitfeld and Thomas Sorby scoring for England.

In 1879, he helped the Old Etonians reach the Cup Final where they met Clapham Rovers at Kennington Oval on 29 March. Bury and his team captain, Arthur Kinnaird were required to call on "their well-known powers ... to keep the enemy out of their quarters". The match was dominated by the defences and was goalless at half-time. In the second half, Charles Clerke scored for the Old Etonians "following an excellent run by Goodhart" and "arguably the poorest Cup Final to date" ended in a 1–0 victory for the Old Etonians.

Bury served on The Football Association committee in 1878.

He also played for Swifts F.C. and in representative matches for The South v The North.

Cricket career
He played cricket for Cambridge University in 1877 and 1878, and made one appearance for Hampshire against Derbyshire in July 1877. He was a right-handed batsman and a fast right-arm bowler. In his nine first-class appearances, he totalled 115 runs at an average of 9.58 and claimed 18 wickets at an average of 13.83.

Life after sport
He later emigrated to Florida where he became an orange planter, possibly in association with his former Eton College and Cambridge University compatriot Rupert Anderson who had gone to Florida at the same time.

Bury subsequently returned to England, settling near Bradfield, Berkshire where he died, aged seventy-eight, on 30 October 1935. He was a J.P. for that county. In the First World War he volunteered to serve with the French Red Cross.

Honours
Old Etonians
FA Cup winners: 1879

References

External links
England football profile at www.englandstats.com
England football profile at www.englandfc.com
Profile at www.englandfootballonline.com
Cricket profile on cricketarchive
Cricket profile on cricinfo

1857 births
People from Withington
1935 deaths
People educated at Eton College
English footballers
Association football defenders
Old Etonians F.C. players
Cambridge University A.F.C. players
England international footballers
English cricketers
Cambridge University cricketers
Hampshire cricketers
Alumni of Trinity College, Cambridge
FA Cup Final players